Janet Landgard (born December 2, 1947) is an American actress and model. She starred with Burt Lancaster in the 1968 film The Swimmer written by Eleanor Perry and directed by Frank Perry. Landgard was also a regular on the 1960s television series The Donna Reed Show. She also starred in 1970's Land Raiders with Telly Savalas and the 1974 film Moonchild with Victor Buono.

Landgard was interviewed for the behind-the-scenes documentary directed by Chris Innis, The Story of the Swimmer, which was featured on the 2014 Grindhouse Releasing/Box Office Spectaculars Blu-ray/DVD restoration of The Swimmer.

Acting roles

References

External links

1947 births
Actresses from California
American film actresses
American television actresses
People from Pasadena, California
Living people
21st-century American women